Levnî Abdülcelil Çelebi (1680s–1732) was an early 18th century Ottoman court painter under the Sultans Mustafa II and Ahmed III. He was a prominent Ottoman miniaturist during the Tulip Period, well-regarded for his traditional yet innovative style.

Biography
Levnî Abdülcelil Çelebi was born in Edirne and most likely belonged to a high class family in the empire because his title, Çelebi, means "gentleman".

Levnî began his work in Istanbul during Sultan Mustafa II's rule and eventually became chief painter at the palace atelier. During his stay at the palace, he specialized in the Saz style, which is characterized by stylized leaf designs. In spite of his high artist status, his name does not appear on a lists of artists working for the palace during his time. However, his signed artworks and influence on subsequent artists are evidence that he was an important artist of his time. Levnî died in Istanbul during the early 18th century.

Notable works 
Levnî's most notable works include the Kebir Musavver Silsilename in Topkapi Palace Library (A3109), Surname-i Vehbi ("Book of Festivals") in the Library of Ahmed II in Topkapi Palace Museum, and an Album of miniatures at the Topkapi Palace Library.

Kebir Musaver Silsilmane, Topkapi Palace Museum Library 

Also known as the Series of Sultan Portraits, this work contains twenty-three padishas, including portraits of Sultan Mahmud I, Sultan Osman III, Sultan Mustafa III, and Sultan Abdulhamid I.  Gathering influence from western styles, particularly portraiture of Rafael, Levnî created a genealogical tree of the Sultans using images instead of text like traditional padishas.

Levnî's signature style in this work is evident in the size and color of the portraits in the book. His portraits are large (14.3 cm x 23.5 cm x 16.4 cm x 25 cm), and the subjects are turned 3/4 to the right or left of the view of the viewer. Additionally, he used a wide range of colors, both bright primary and pastel tones. His combination of color palettes was innovative for its time and gave way to a new style of Ottoman miniature art.

Surname-i Vebbi 
The Surname-i Vebbi is a ceremony book containing a series of miniatures depicting scenes from the circumcision of the sons of the Sultan in 1720. The event was celebrated for fifteen days and fifteen nights and involved a courtly processions. Levnî was commissioned by Seyyd Hüseyin Vehbi to record the event in manuscript form. The miniatures in the Surname-i Vebbi are elaborate , capturing varying angles of movement in a wide range of colors and shapes. There is also evidence of the Persian influence in the paintings some examples of which are the cultural objects in the background and the attire of some of the figures.

Album Paintings 
The Album paintings captures daily life in the Ottoman empire during the Tulip period. In it, Levnî painted portraits of various people of both noble and common backgrounds in different poses and doing everyday activities. Each image is separated form the others and has its own color composition and subject matter. The styles of attire, fabric patterns and the type of activities reflect the finery and richness of the Tulip Period.

Other Works 
Levni was also a notable poet and wrote on the subjects of heroism and war and daily life in the Ottoman empire. Some of his work are found in the poetry manuscript (Mecmua-i Es'ar, H1715) in the Treasure Library of Topkapi Palace Museum Library. Like his paintings, Levnî combined traditional styles of courts, particularly the aruz meter, as well as humor and popular language of the people in his poetry.

Examples of Levnî's miniatures

See also
 Culture of the Ottoman Empire

References

External links 

Year of birth missing
1732 deaths
Miniaturists from the Ottoman Empire
People from Edirne
18th-century artists from the Ottoman Empire
18th-century painters from the Ottoman Empire